John Atkinson Leighton (October 4, 1861 – October 31, 1956) was a 19th-century Major League Baseball outfielder with the Syracuse Stars of the American Association. He appeared in seven games for the Stars during the 1890 season. His minor league career stretched from 1887 through 1901 and included a couple of years as a minor league manager, in 1894 and 1908.

External links

1861 births
1956 deaths
19th-century baseball players
Major League Baseball outfielders
Syracuse Stars (AA) players
Lynn Lions players
Salem Fairies players
Portsmouth Lillies players
Quincy Black Birds players
London Tecumsehs (baseball) players
Syracuse Stars (minor league baseball) players
Manchester Amskoegs players
Minor league baseball managers
Providence Grays (minor league) players
Springfield Ponies players
Reading Actives players
Taunton Herrings players
Johnstown Mormans players
Palmyra Mormans players
Baseball players from Massachusetts
People from Peabody, Massachusetts
Sportspeople from Essex County, Massachusetts
Woonsocket (minor league baseball) players